Orbit Semiconductor, Inc. manufactures semiconductors devices. The Company designs electronic systems for application in the medical, telecommunication, consumer, aerospace, military and manufacturing sectors.

Orbit Semiconductor is a recognized and established player in FPGA to ASIC conversions
and in ASIC to ASIC conversions, with a solid experience of thousands of successful conversions in the last 14 years.Orbit Semiconductor specializes in the low-cost, high-volume consumer market
and the complementary low-to-medium volume communications, industrial, medical and military markets. Orbit Semiconductor has proprietary gate-array technology delivering a flexible response at low cost.

Company history
Orbit Semiconductor was founded in 1985 by Gary P. Kennedy in Sunnyvale, California. In 1991, Orbit Semiconductor underwent a management buy-out (MBO) by Gary P. Kennedy and his associates. In 1992, Orbit Semiconductor became a pioneer in the FPGA Conversion arena. Orbit Semiconductor successfully underwent an initial public offering (IPO) in 1994, trading as ORB on NASDAQ. In 1998, Orbit Semiconductor merged with DII Group, Inc., and in 2000, DII Group merged with Flextronics Semiconductor, Inc. In September 2005, AMI Semiconductor acquired the Semiconductor Division of Flextronics, Inc., and in February 2007, the Orbit team became independent.

References

External links 

 Orbit Semiconductor website

Fabless semiconductor companies
Semiconductor companies of the United States